Buckwild: Diggin' in the Crates is a compilation of rare hip hop songs and remixes produced by Buckwild.

Disc 1
Channel Live feat. KRS-One - ''Mad Izm (Original Remix)' scratches - O.Gee / DJ Ogee
Nas feat. AZ- 'Life's a Bitch (Remix #1)'	-
Artifacts feat. Busta Rhymes - 'C'Mon wit the Get Down (Remix)'
Lord Finesse - 'Hip 2 the Game (Remix)
Brand Nubian - 'Word Is Bond (Remix)
Beastie Boys feat. Q Tip - 'Get It Together (Remix)"
Jemini the Gifted One - 'Scars and Pain
AK Skills - 'Nights of Fear"
Big L - 'MVP (Remix #1)"
Funkdoobiest - 'Rock On (Remix)'
Ill Biskits - 'A Better Day'
Grand Puba feat. Sadat X - 'I Like It (Remix)'
Reservoir Doggs - 'Back to Berth'
Kool Keith - 'Yo Black (Remix)'
F.A.T.A.L. Fountain - 'All About Warz'
O.C. - 'Burn Me Slow'
Little Indian feat. The Foreigner - 'One Little Indian (Remix)'
Chubb Rock - 'What a Year'
Mike Zoot - 'Live & Stink'

Disc 2
Organized Konfusion - 'Bring It On (Remix)'
Showbiz & A.G. - 'You Know Now (Remix)'
Bushwackas - 'Caught Up in the Game'
Guru feat. Bahamadia - 'Respect the Architect (Remix)'
Tha Alkaholiks - 'DAAAM! (Remix)'
Street Smartz - 'Problemz'
Brand Nubian - 'Rockin It'
Big L - 'MVP (Remix #2)'
Black Sheep - 'North South East West (Remix)'
Jemini the Gifted One - 'Story of My Life'
Diamond D feat. Lord Finesse, Sadat X - 'You Can't Front'
Nas feat. AZ - 'Life's a Bitch (Remix #2)'
Sadat X feat. Grand Puba, Lord Jamar - 'The Lump Lump (Nubian Mix)'
Special Ed - 'Lyrics (Remix)'
Channel Live - 'Mad Izm ('95 Remix)'
Lace Da Booms feat. Kwaze Modoe, Royal Flush - 'Cut That Weak Shit (Remix)'
O.C. - 'Love Child'
Rakim- 'Guess Who's Back (Remix)'
Reservoir Doggs - 'The Difference'
Mystidious Misfitss - 'I Be (Remix)'

References

Albums produced by Buckwild
Hip hop compilation albums
2007 compilation albums